The 3rd constituency of Val-d'Oise is a French legislative constituency in the Val-d'Oise département.  It is currently represented by
Cécile Rilhac of Renaissance (RE).

Description

The 3rd constituency of Val d'Oise includes the towns of Cormeilles-en-Parisis, Taverny and Herblay all of which form part of the northern suburbs of Paris.

The seat has a marginal profile and in 2012 was won by Jean-Noël Carpentier of Robert Hue's Progressive Unitary Movement becoming the party's one and only deputy.

Historic Representation

Election results

2022

 
 
 
 
 
 
 
|-
| colspan="8" bgcolor="#E9E9E9"|
|-

2017

2012

 
 
 
 
 
 
|-
| colspan="8" bgcolor="#E9E9E9"|
|-

2007

 
 
 
 
 
 
 
|-
| colspan="8" bgcolor="#E9E9E9"|
|-

2002

 
 
 
 
|-
| colspan="8" bgcolor="#E9E9E9"|
|-

1997

 
 
 
 
 
 
 
|-
| colspan="8" bgcolor="#E9E9E9"|
|-

Sources

Official results of French elections from 2002: "Résultats électoraux officiels en France" (in French).

3